The National Graphene Institute is a research institute and building at the University of Manchester that is focused on the research of graphene. Construction of the building to house the institute started in 2013 and finished in 2015.

Institute 
The creation of the Institute, including the construction of the building, cost £61 million. Funded by the UK Government (£38m) and the European Union's European Regional Development Fund (£23m), the building is the national centre for graphene research in the UK. It provides facilities for industry and university academics to collaborate on graphene applications and the commercialisation of graphene. The building was opened on 20 March 2015 by the then Chancellor of the Exchequer George Osborne.

Building 
The five-storey glass-fronted building provides  of research space. This includes  of class 100 and class 1000 clean rooms, one of which occupies the entire lower ground floor (in order to minimise vibrations) plus laser, optical, metrology and chemical laboratories, along with offices, a seminar room and accommodation. The top floor also includes a roof terrace, which has 21 different grasses and wildflowers designed to attract urban bees and other species of pollinators. The outside of the building consists of a composite cladding, with an external stainless steel 'veil'. The building faces on to Booth Street East. Construction started in March 2013, with the building being completed in 2015.

The building was designed by Jestico + Whiles in close collaboration with a team of academics lead by Prof Sir Konstantin Novoselov. It cost around £30m, and was constructed by Bam Construct. The structural design was produced by Ramboll. Other shortlisted organisations were: Lend Lease, Laing O'Rourke, Morgan Sindall, Vinci, and M&W Group). The design work was led by EC Harris, along with CH2M Hill who provided specialist technical architecture design services for the cleanrooms and laboratories, together with Mechanical, Electrical and Process (MEP) consultant services.

History of the location 
The Institute was constructed on the former site of the Albert Club, which was a Victorian club that was located between Lawson Street and Clifford Street. The club was established for the middle class German community that were involved in Manchester's cotton trade, and Friedrich Engels frequented it during his time in the city, becoming a member in 1842. The club was located on Clifford Street from 1842 prior to its relocation in 1859. The building was constructed by the architect Jeptha Pacey as his personal house, and it was fronted by formal gardens. It was later converted into a private social club, which was named after Albert, Prince Consort. More recently it had been re-purposed as Turkish public baths, and was later used as a hospital for women and children. The building was demolished in the 1960s, and the site was used for the construction of the Lamb Building.

The excavations that took place in February 2013 by Oxford Archaeology North, prior to the construction of the Institute, uncovered the remnants of the club building along with a row of five cellars belonging to 1830s terraced housing. A sink removed from the site has been incorporated into the Institute's new building.

Gallery

References

External links

The University of Manchester's webpage on the National Graphene Institute

Buildings at the University of Manchester
Graphene
Organisations based in Manchester
Nanotechnology institutions